Monsoon is the fifth studio album and first major label album by American alternative rock band Caroline's Spine. It featured almost entirely songs that can be found on their previous independent releases but were re-recorded or remastered for this album. The single "Sullivan" climbed to #23 on Billboard’s Mainstream Rock chart, as well as #14 on R&R’s Active Rock Chart. The success of this album also earned them a gig playing on board the United States Navy aircraft carrier USS Enterprise.

Track listing
All songs written by Jimmy Newquist.
 "King For a Day"  – 3:17
 "You & Me"  – 4:22
 "Sullivan"  – 4:05
 "Wallflower"  – 4:56
 "Monsoon"  – 4:34
 "Unglued" – 2:38
 "Trio' Pain"  – 2:50
 "Psycho"  – 3:19
 "Necro"  – 3:07
 "So Good Afternoon"  – 5:32
 "Say it to You"  – 3:22
 "Sweet N' Sour"  – 3:08
 "Hippie Boy"  – 4:30

Personnel
Jimmy Newquist - vocals, guitar, bass, discipline
Mark Haugh - guitar, vocals, the way
Jason Gilardi - drums and protection
Scott Jones - bass, vocals, snacker

Additional personnel
Edgar "Chodie" Knoll - sound

Technical
Information from album liner.
Produced by Jimmy Newquist and Caroline's Spine
Executive producer and A&R direction: Mitchell Leib
All words and music by Jimmy Newquist (BMI)
Recorded by Dan Calderone
Assistant Joe Statt
Recorded at ANZA Digital - San Diego, California
Mixed by Nick DiDia
Assistant Caram Costanzo
Mixed at Southern Tracks Studios - Atlanta, GA
Mastered by Stephen Marcussen at Precision Mastering

Managerial and design
The law - David Rudich Esq.
Business manager - Shapiro and Company
Management - Doc McGhee and Sandy Rizzo for McGhee Entertainment
Creative director - Dave Snow
Art direction and design - Jennifer Tough
Photography - Matthew Welch
Cover photograph - Renard Garr
Styling - Keki Mingus
Hair and grooming - Natalie McGowan Spencer
Calligraphy - Nancy Ogami

References

1997 albums
Caroline's Spine albums
Hollywood Records albums